Cytokine-like protein 1 (also protein C17) is a protein that in humans is encoded by the CYTL1 gene.

Function 

Protein C17 is a cytokine-like protein specifically expressed in bone marrow and cord blood mononuclear cells that bear the CD34 surface marker. Functionally, C17 was identified as a secretory protein expressed in CD34+ haemopoietic cells. CYTL1 seems to regulate chondrogenesis and is required for the maintenance of cartilage homeostasis and might, additionally, work as a regulatory factor in embryo implantation in the stage of early pregnancy.

This family of proteins, C17, is found in vertebrates. Proteins have two conserved sequence motifs: PPTCYSR and DDC.

References

Further reading